Myles O'Donnell was an Irish American bootlegger and mobster during the Roaring Twenties in Chicago during Prohibition. He was most famous for being the founder of the West-side O'Donnell Mob aka the Westside O'Donnells or West-side gang (no relation to the South Side O'Donnells, a rival gang).

Early years

Myles O’Donnell was born into a large, struggling Irish Catholic family in the Chicago Western suburb of Cicero, Illinois. Like any other poor child off the streets in the town of Cicero, Myles started his criminal career committing petty crime.

William "Klondike" O’Donnell was only a few years younger than his brother. They, along with their youngest brother, Bernard, entered the bootlegging business together.

Alliance with Torrio

The O’Donnell brothers made an alliance with Johnny Torrio, the leader of the Chicago Outfit. When Torrio got into a war with Dean O'Banion and the North Side Gang and when the South Side O’Donnells got into a war with Frank McErlane things went better for the O’Donnells not having to worry about enemies.

Getting away with murder

One day after drinking himself to the point where he was staggering, Myles and a childhood friend and Westside O'Donnell member Jim Doherty staggered into a saloon early Sunday morning. The saloon belonged to Eddie Tancl, a man O'Donnell and Capone hated because of his way of buying beer from whomever he wished. Myles and Jim ordered some breakfast from the only waiter still working on the job that day. Sitting across from the two Westsiders were Eddie Tancl and his wife. Sitting across from the couple were Mayme McClain, Tancl's star entertainer, and Leo Klimas, Tancl's head bartender. After Myles and Jim were done eating they complained to the waiter that they had been overcharged on the bill. Tancl made his way to the O'Donnells' table and blocked his way in between the waiter and O'Donnell just before he threw a punch at the waiter. O'Donnell gave Tancl a shove and then both men drew their guns.  They shot each other in the chest. Doherty got up from the table and began firing. Klimas and the waiter tried to disarm Doherty. O'Donnell fired a shot at Klimas pushing him back against the bar, where he died.  O'Donnell was hit by four shots in the chest while he proceeded to the street with Doherty.  Tancl was also hit in the chest in numerous places, and Doherty was hit several times in the leg by Tancl during the gun battle. Tancl and O'Donnell had no bullets left in their guns, but Doherty did. As the two Westsiders made their way to the street, Eddie Tancl grabbed a different gun from behind the bar. Sources say that Myles and Doherty split up and went different directions through the streets. The way Myles ran it was hard for him to get away, because he was in the middle of the street running through Sunday churchgoers while bleeding heavily. Tancl chased after O'Donnell through the streets, shooting at him until his gun was empty. Out of breath, Tancl threw his empty handgun at the back of O'Donnell's head. O'Donnell fell and passed out due to exhaustion; Tancl fell as well but didn't pass out. As Tancl and O'Donnell lay just a few feet from each other in the middle of the street, the waiter O'Donnell had tried to hit ran towards O'Donnell and Tancl. Tancl shouted to the waiter, "He got me, get him." Those were his last words. The waiter jumped on O'Donnell's body a few times, kicked him in the face, and fled the crime scene. Doherty managed to limp his way to a nearby hospital to treat the gunshot wounds to his leg. Myles was later picked up by cops in the place where he had passed out.

Other sources state different events in which Myles fled the saloon first and Klimas was never hit because he hid during the gun battle. Tancl shot Doherty, and Doherty fell and never returned fire or got up after that. Myles ran outside the saloon and through the streets. Tancl chased after him and essentially followed the same series of events in the first story. Klimas ran after his boss to aid him. Tancl said to Klimas, "Leo, kill the rat, he got me," and Klimas did what the waiter is reported to have done in the first story. Doherty got up and stumbled into the streets, where he saw Klimas beating O'Donnell up. Doherty stumbled behind Klimas and shot him in the head at point blank range, killing him instantly. Doherty picked up O'Donnell, put him in his car and they both drove away.

O'Donnell and Doherty were both arrested when injured from gunfire. Both of the Irish gangsters were put on trial after they had recovered. The prosecutor handling the case of the double homicide failed to convince the judge to convict both gangsters. It is said both gangsters left the courtroom after being released with a group of family and friends happy to see them released. Sources say the gangsters left with a group of good-looking women.

Myles and Doherty were never arrested for the murders, although there were many witnesses. It was rumored that the man prosecuting them was a childhood friend who purposely failed to prosecute Myles and Doherty for the murders of Klimas and Tancl. His name was William McSwiggin. He was one of Illinois' best prosecutors and prosecuted many criminals. McSwiggin got the nickname "Hanging Prosecutor" due to his ruthless tactics in taking down hard criminals, and he fully supported the death penalty as a final punishment.

McSwiggin
William McSwiggin was born and raised in the Chicago suburb of Cicero. McSwiggin, who usually went by the name Bill or Will, befriended the O'Donnell brothers and Doherty at a young age. He was known for his powerful, athletic build. His father was a police officer for many years. Unlike his hoodlum friends, his occupation was Illinois state prosecutor.

On the night of April 27, 1926, McSwiggin was out bar-crawling in Cicero with James J. Doherty, and Thomas "Red" Duffy.  An assailant with a machine gun attacked the group outside the Pony Inn saloon at 5613 W 12th St (now Roosevelt Rd). All three were killed.

Death of Myles O'Donnell
Sometime in early 1933, Myles O'Donnell was shot by a bartender during a drunken argument. Myles killed the bartender but was shot in the lung. He contracted pneumonia soon after and died on March 10, 1933. Myles was buried the same day as Mayor Anton Cermak, on March 10.

Klondike took over the West Side rackets, but failed in his attempts to make them as profitable as they had been in the past. With the booze racket gone, Klondike tried to make ends meet with his fleet of trucks, supplying them to local Chicago gangster Jack "Three Fingered" White, who ran a labor union racket called TNT. This forced members to cough up payments and dues. After it got too messy the feds found out and shut the racket down again, leaving Klondike penniless.

O'Donnell mob members
Myles O'Donnell - Leader and founder of the Westside/O'Donnell mob.
William "Klondike" O'Donnell - underboss.
Bernard O'Donnell - Brewery owner.
Jim Doherty - O'Donnell soldier, enforcer, gunman, best friend and right-hand man to Myles.
Thomas "Red" Duffy - Soldier.
James "Fur" Sammons - Klondike's hit man, was considered by some to be a crazed rapist.
William McCue - O'Donnell beer deliverer, found killed in a ditch. Doherty killed him because he was "skimming" from the money he collected  in Doherty's saloons.
Walter Quinlan - O'Donnell Gunman, killed in a saloon by John Ryan
Teddy "The Greek" Trakas - gold jeweler

Sources
Paddy Whacked by T.J. English Page 161 year 2005
Mr. Capone by Robert J. Scheonberg
The St Valentine's Day Massacre (BY: William J Helmer & Arthur J. Bilek)

Year of birth missing
1933 deaths
Depression-era gangsters
American people of Irish descent
Chicago Outfit mobsters
American gangsters of Irish descent
American gangsters
Prohibition-era gangsters
People from Cicero, Illinois
Deaths from pneumonia in Illinois